The Minerva-class sailing frigates were a series of four ships built to a 1778 design by Sir Edward Hunt, which served in the Royal Navy during the latter decades of the eighteenth century.

During the early stages of the American Revolutionary War, the Royal Navy – while well supplied with ships from earlier programs, but faced with coastal operations and trade protection tasks along the American littoral – ordered numerous forty-four gun, two-decked ships and thirty-two gun 12-pounder armed frigates. Anticipating the entry of European powers into the war, and with renewed resistance provided by the large, nine hundred ton, thirty-two gun 12-pounder armed frigates of the French Navy, the RN looked to a newer larger design of frigate to meet this challenge. From November 1778 larger frigates with a heavier 18-pounder primary armament were ordered.

They were the first Royal Navy frigates designed to be armed with the eighteen-pounder cannon on their upper deck, the main gun deck of a frigate. Before coming into service, their designed secondary armament was augmented, with 9-pounder guns being substituted for the 6-pounder guns originally planned, and with ten 18-pounder carronades being added (six on the quarter deck and four on the forecastle). The type eventually proved successful, and went on to be virtually the standard frigate type during the latter periods of the age of sail.

Ships in class 

 Builder:  Woolwich Dockyard
 Ordered:   6 November 1778
 Laid down:  November 1778
 Launched:  3 June 1780
 Completed: 6 July 1780
 Fate: Fitted as a troopship and renamed Pallas 29 May 1798; broken up March 1803 at Chatham Dockyard.

 Builder:  James Martin Hilhouse, Bristol
 Ordered:  26 January 1779
 Laid down:  23 August 1779
 Launched:  10 April 1781
 Fate:  Broken up May 1815 at Sheerness Dockyard.

 Builder:  John Smallshaw, Liverpool.
 Ordered:  3 March 1780
 Laid down: June 1780
 Launched:  12 June 1782
 Completed: 27 December 1782 at Plymouth Dockyard.
 Fate:  Sold to break up 26 March 1828

 Builder:  John Randall, Rotherhithe.
 Ordered: 22 September 1781
 Laid down:  December 1781
 Launched:  23 September 1782 
 Completed: 15 November 1782 at Deptford Dockyard.
 Fate:  Sold 9 June 1814 at Chatham Dockyard.

References
 Robert Gardiner, The Heavy Frigate, Conway Maritime Press, London 1994.
 Rif Winfield, British Warships in the Age of Sail, 1713-1792, Seaforth Publishing, Barnsley 2007.
 Rif Winfield, British Warships in the Age of Sail, 1793-1817, Chatham Publishing, London 2005.

Frigates of the Royal Navy
 
Ship classes of the Royal Navy
Minerva class